Herminigildo G. Ranera (born 2 May 1961) is a Filipino conductor, composer, arranger, performer and educator.

He graduated from the UST Conservatory of Music with a Bachelor of Music degree, majoring in trombone and theory, and finished with a Master of Music degree in conducting from the University of Northern Colorado (UNC). He is pursuing his Doctor of Philosophy degree with a major in Educational Management at the Cagayan State University. While at the UNC, Ranera was honored with the Deans's citation for the Graduate Excellence and National Graduate Award.

A multiply awarded performer, he is a three-time prize-winner of the National Music Competition for Young Artists (NAMCYA) in 1982 and 1983 as a performer in trombone, baritone, and tuba categories, respectively. He also won the first prize in chamber music in the same competition.

Upon returning from his studies in the United States, he focused on his composing and conducting skills. A prize-winner of the 1983 League of Filipino Composers Competition for Young Composers, he has written incidental music in collaboration with fellow composer Fr. Manuel P. Maramba, OSB for various productions of the Cultural Center of the Philippines. He is also active in orchestral arranging, where his works have been featured in the CD albums of Redentor Romero, featuring the Moscow Symphony Orchestra and the Warsaw Philharmonic Orchestra. He has recorded an album entitled Symphonic Winds with the UST Symphony Band in multiple roles as conductor, composer, and orchestra arranger.

As an orchestra conductor, he has led the Philippine Philharmonic Orchestra, CSULB Symphony Orchestra, Chia-yi Wind Orchestra and the UST Symphony Orchestra, as well as the Transylvania Philharmonic Orchestra in Club, Romania.

His varied programs include the World Premiere of three Filipino Operas - Fr. Maramba's "Aba Sto. Nino" and "La Naval", and Jerry Dadap's "Lorenzo Ruiz", Fr. Maramba's "Sarsuwela sa San Salvador". Other programs include the Philippine Premier of Busoni Piano Concerto and a rare performance of the four Rachmaninoff Piano Concertos, with Dr. Raul Sunico as the piano soloist.

He has also served as a musical director and conductor of the 2004 National Theater Festivals's "GILAS!" Pagdiriwang Pilipino and the 2005 Philippine Opera Company's "OPERA NOW!", which featured 30 of the country's top caliber artists performing best loved opera arias with the Philippine Philharmonic Orchestra.

Ranera served as a visiting professor at the National Taiwan University in Taipei (1989) and was head of the Philippine delegation to the workshop in the People's Republic of China (1990), as well as the ASEAN Symphonic Band Workshops in Singapore (1992) and Thailand (1994). In 1997, he was invited as a guest lecturer, resident composer and guest conductor to the California State University-Long Beach, where he made his American debut with the CSULB Symphony Orchestra. He later led the UST Symphony Band at the 4th Asian Symphonic Band Competition in Bangkok, Thailand in 2002. He is affiliated with the Conductor's Guild International and the Asia-Pacific Band Directors Association.

Ranera is teaching at the UST Conservatory of Music, where he is the conductor of the UST Symphony Orchestra and Wind Orchestra, and is also the coordinator of the Brass Department. He also teaches at the International School Manila (ISM). In 2003, he was chosen to be the Dangal Awardee (most outstanding faculty), Performing Arts Category by the University of Santo Tomas and the 2006 Patnubay ng Sining at Kalinangan Awardee for Music given by the City of Manila.

Last May 2007, under his baton, the UST Symphony Orchestra had a very successful concert tour in the cities of Zhuhai and Guangzhou, China.

References

Filipino conductors (music)
Living people
1961 births
University of Santo Tomas alumni
University of Northern Colorado alumni
21st-century conductors (music)